Liurana alpina is a species of frog in the family Ceratobatrachidae. It is endemic to China and only known from its type locality, Dayandong in Mêdog County, Tibet. This little known species lives under moss in forest at about  asl.

References

Frogs of China
Endemic fauna of Tibet
Amphibians described in 1997
Taxonomy articles created by Polbot
alpina